Lieutenant General John Cedric Grey AC (born 31 January 1939) was a senior officer in the Australian Army who served as Chief of the General Staff from 1992 to 1995. He was Chancellor of James Cook University from 1999 to 2016.

Early life
Grey was born in Sydney, New South Wales, on 31 January 1939 to Aubrey Cedric and Dacia Downing Grey. He was educated at St Andrew's Cathedral School and Sydney Grammar School, before entering the Royal Military College, Duntroon as an officer cadet in 1957.

Military career
Grey was posted to the 3rd Cavalry Regiment and, as a captain, was deployed to Vietnam for which he was belatedly awarded the Commendation for Distinguished Service. By 1984 he had been promoted to colonel and made Director of Co-ordination at the Department of Defence.

He became Assistant Chief of Defence Force, Logistics and was made an Officer of the Order of Australia (AO) in 1991 for service in that role.

He was appointed Chief of the General Staff in 1992 and made a Companion of the Order of Australia (AC) in 1995 for outstanding leadership, inspiration and dedication to the Australian Army during a period of profound restructuring.

Retirement
In retirement he established his own consultancy business based in Cairns; he also became a Non-Executive Director of Tarong Energy and Chancellor of James Cook University. In 2003 he was appointed Chairman of Queensland's Wet Tropics Management Authority Board.

Honours, awards and qualifications
 Companion of the Order of Australia (AC) 12 June 1995
 Officer of the Order of Australia (AO) 26 January 1991
 Commendation for Distinguished Service 3 June 1998
 Fellow of the Australian Institute of Management (F.A.I.M.)
 Graduate member of the Australian Institute of Company Directors (G.A.I.D.C.)
 National Defence College (India) (N.D.C.(I).)
 Joint Services Staff College (Australia) (J.S.S.C.)

See also
List of Australian generals and brigadiers

References

1939 births
Military personnel from New South Wales
Australian generals
Australian military personnel of the Vietnam War
Companions of the Order of Australia
Academic staff of James Cook University
Living people
People educated at Sydney Grammar School
People from Sydney
Recipients of the Commendation for Distinguished Service
Royal Military College, Duntroon graduates
Chiefs of Army (Australia)